The History of the Saints: Gathering to the West is a television documentary series produced by Dennis Lyman and Glenn Rawson. It focuses on the history of the Church of Jesus Christ of Latter-day Saints (LDS Church) and its members following the death of Joseph Smith. This includes the story of the Mormon Pioneers as  they left behind Nauvoo, Illinois and traveled along the Mormon Trail to Utah.

Production
Following the completion of The Joseph Smith Papers TV series, the same team that produced that series began work on the History of the Saints. A full-length preview of the program was shown October 2, 2010, on KSL-TV, following the Saturday morning session of the 180th Semiannual General Conference. Season one began airing October 10, 2010 on KSL-TV.

Plot synopsis
The first season begins with the death of Joseph Smith and the succession crisis, and then follows the story of the Mormon Pioneers as they traveled the Mormon Trail to the Rocky Mountains and what would become the Utah Territory. Other seasons are expected and will tell the story of the colonization of the Intermountain West and Church developments in Utah.

Episode list
The first column refers to the episode's number in the overall series.
The second column refers to the episode's number in that particular season.

Season 1: 2010

See also
The Joseph Smith Papers (TV series)

Notes

External links
Official Site

History of the Church of Jesus Christ of Latter-day Saints
History of the Latter Day Saint movement
2010 American television series debuts
2010 in Christianity
2010s American documentary television series
21st-century Mormonism